This is a list of countries by annual electricity production. China is the world's largest electricity producing country, followed by the United States and India.



Total production
If possible, country links link to articles about the electricity sector.

Production by source

Source: World Development Indicators: Electricity production, sources, and access (2011)

Note: The percentage are subjected to round-off errors.

See also
List of countries by electricity consumption
List of countries by energy consumption per capita
List of countries by energy intensity
List of countries by renewable electricity production
List of countries by total primary energy consumption and production

References 

Energy-related lists by country
production